Dermatobranchus caesitius is a species of sea slug, a nudibranch, a marine gastropod mollusc in the family Arminidae.

Distribution
This species was described from Umgazana on the Indian Ocean coast of South Africa, .

References

Arminidae
Gastropods described in 2011